was a town located in Nishitama District, Tokyo Metropolis, Japan.

Itsukaichi Town, a medieval settlement, was promoted to town status within Kanagawa Prefecture in 1879, and merged with Konakano Village on April 1, 1889. The entire district was transferred to the administrative control of Tokyo Metropolis on April 1, 1893. The town expanded through annexation of the neighboring villages of Mitsusato and Meiji in 1918, and with Masuko, Tokura and Komiya in 1955. In 1995, the town of Itsukaichi merged with the city of Akigawa to form the new city of Akiruno, and thus no longer exists as an independent municipality.

At the time of its merger, the town had an estimated population of 22,252 and a density of 437 persons per km2. The total area was 50.90 km2.

Notable people from Itsukaichi
Take Hagiwara (1873–1936), nurse
Tsutomu Miyazaki (1962–2008), serial killer

Populated places disestablished in 1995
Dissolved municipalities of Tokyo